There are two astronomical General Catalogues:

Boss General Catalogue, an astronomical catalogue compiled by Benjamin Boss and published in the U.S. in 1936
General Catalogue of Nebulae and Clusters, an astronomical catalogue by John Herschel expanding on the work of his father William Herschel

See also
 New General Catalogue
 Revised New General Catalogue

Astronomical catalogues